"Pilot" (or occasionally "The Pilot" or "Pilot Episode") is the title of numerous television pilots.

0–9 

"Pilot" (10 Things I Hate About You)
"Pilot" (12 Miles of Bad Road)
"Pilot" (The 100)
"Pilot: Putting Out Fires" (1600 Penn)
"Pilot" (2 Broke Girls)
"Pilot" (21 Jump Street)
"Pilot" (30 Rock)
"Pilot" (413 Hope St.)
"Pilot" (The 4400)
"Pilot" (The 5 Mrs. Buchanans)
"Pilot" (666 Park Avenue)
"Pilot" (8 Simple Rules)
"Pilot" (9JKL)
"Pilot" (9-1-1)
"Pilot" (9-1-1: Lone Star)

A 

"Pilot" (a.k.a. Pablo)
"Pilot" (A.U.S.A.)
"Pilot" (Abbott Elementary)
"Pilot" (Abby's)
"Pilot" (About a Boy)
"About a Pilot" (About a Girl)
"Pilot" (Acapulco) (2021)
"Pilot" (Accidentally on Purpose)
"Pilot" (According to Jim)
"Pilot" (Action)
"Pilot" (Action League Now!)
"Pilot" (The Adventures of Jimmy Neutron, Boy Genius)
"Pilot" (Adventures of Sonic the Hedgehog)
"Pilot" (Adventure Time)
"Pilot" (The Adventures of Brisco County, Jr.)
"Pilot" (Æon Flux)
"Pilot" (Against the Grain)
"Pilot" (Against the Wall)
"Pilot" (The Agency) (2001)
"Pilot" (Agent X)
"Pilot" (Agents of S.H.I.E.L.D.)
"Pilot" (Alaska Daily)
"Pilot" (Alcatraz)
"Pilot" (The Alec Baldwin Show)
"Pilot" (Alexander Armstrong's Big Ask)
"Pilot" (Alien Nation)
"Pilot" (Aliens in America)
"Pilot" (Alice) (American)
"Pilot" (All About the Andersons)
"Pilot" (All American)
"Backboard pilot" (All American: Homecoming)
"Pilot" (All Gas and Gaiters)
"Pilot episodes" (All in the Family)
"Pilot" (All Night)
"Pilot" (All of Us)
"Pilot" (All Rise)
"Pilot" (All Souls)
"Pilot" (Allegiance)
"Pilot" (Allen Gregory)
"Pilot" ('Allo 'Allo!)
"Pilot" (Ally McBeal)
"Pilot" (Almost Family)
"Pilot" (Almost Grown)
"Pilot" (Almost Human)
"Pilot" (Alone Together)
"Pilot" (Alpha House)
"Pilot" (Alphas)
"Pilot" (The Amazing World of Gumball)
"Pilot" (American Auto)
"Pilot" (American Dad!)
"Pilot" (American Dream)
"Pilot" (American Dreamer)
"Pilot" (American Dreams)
"Pilot" (The American Embassy)
"Pilot" (American Gothic) (1995)
"Pilot" (American Horror Story)
"Pilot" (American Princess) (2019)
"Pilot" (American Housewife)
"Pilot" (The Americans) (2013)
"Pilot" (Andy Barker, P.I.)
"Pilot" (Andy Richter Controls the Universe)
"Pilot" (Animal Kingdom)
"Pilot" (Animal Practice)
"Pilot" (Angel Falls)
"Pilot" (Angel from Hell)
"Pilot" (Angel Street)
"Pilot" (Angela's Eyes)
"Pilot" (Angie Tribeca)
"Pilot" (The Antagonists)
"Pilot" (Apple & Onion)
"Pilot" (Apple Pie)
"Pilot" (The Aquabats! Super Show!)
"Pilot" (Are You Being Served?)
"Pilot" (Are You There, Chelsea?)
"Pilot" (The Army Show)
"Pilot" (The Arrangement) (2017)
"Pilot" (Arrested Development)
"Pilot" (Arrow)
"Pilot" (As Told by Ginger)
"Pilot" (Ask Harriet)
"Pilot" (Awake)
"Pilot" (Awkward)

B 

"Pilot" (B Positive)
"Pilot" (B.A.D. Cats)
"Pilot" (Babes)
"Pilot" (Baby Daddy)
"Pilot" (Back in the Game) (2013)
"Pilot" (Back to You)
"Three Men & a Pilot" (Backpackers)
"Pilots" (The Backyardigans)
"Pilot" (Bad Judge)
"Pilot" (Bad Samaritans)
"Pilot" (Bad Teacher)
"Pilot" (Bagdad Cafe)
"Pilot" (The Baker and the Beauty) (American)
"Pilot" (Bakersfield P.D.)
"Pilot" (Ballers)
"Pilot" (Banshee)
"Pilot" (The Bastard Executioner)
"Pilot" (Battleground)
"Pilot" (Battery Park)
"Pilot" (Batwoman)
"Pilot" (Bay City Blues)
"Pilot" (The Beast) (2009)
"Pilot" (The Beautiful Life)
"Pilot" (Beautiful People) (American)
"Pilot" (Beautiful Strangers)
"Pilot" (Beauty & the Beast) (2012)
"Pilot" (Because of You)
"Pilot" (Becker)
"The Italian Pilot" (The Bed-Sit Girl)
"Pilot" (Beggar My Neighbour)
"Pilot" (Being Human) (British)
"Pilot" (Being Mary Jane)
"Pilot" (Believe)
"Pilot" (Ben and Kate)
"Pilot" (The Ben Stiller Show)
"Pilot" (Benched)
"Pilot" (Benson)
"Pilot" (Bent)
"Pilot" (The Bernie Mac Show)
"Pilot" (Best Friends Forever) (American)
"Pilot" (Betas)
"Pilot" (Betrayal)
"Pilot" (Better Off Ted)
"Sam/Pilot" (Better Things)
"Pilot" (Better with You)
"Pilot" (Beverly Hills Buntz)
"Pilot" (Beyond) (American)
"Pilot" (Big Apple)
"Pilot" (The Big Bang Theory)
"Pilot" (The Big C)
"Pilot" (Big Day)
"Pilot" (Big Love)
"Pilot" (Big Shot)
"Pilot" (Big Shots)
"Pilot" (Big Sky)
"Pilot" (Big Wave Dave's)
"Pilot" (Big Wolf on Campus)
"Pilot" (Bill Nye the Science Guy)
"Pilot" (Billions)
"Pilot" (Billy) (1979)
"Pilot" (Billy) (1992)
"Pilot" (Birdland)
"Pilot" (Birds of Prey)
"Original unaired pilot" (Black Books)
"Pilot Episode" (Black Books)
"Pilot" (The Black Donnellys)
"Pilot" (Black Dynamite)
"Pilot" (Black-ish)
"Pilot" (Black Sash)
"Unaired pilot" (Blackadder)
"Pilot" (The Blacklist)
"Pilot" (Blade: The Series)
"Pilot" (The Bleak Old Shop of Stuff)
"Pilot" (Bless This Mess)
"Pilot" (Blind Justice)
"Pilot" (Blockbuster)
"Pilot" (Blood & Oil)
"Pilot" (Blossom)
"Pilot" (Blue Bloods)
"Pilot" (Blue's Clues)
"Pilot" (Bluff City Law)
"Pilot" (Bob Hearts Abishola)
"Pilot" (Bob Patterson)
"Pilot" (Bob the Builder)
"Pilot" (Body of Proof)
"Pilot" (The Bold Type)
"Pilot" (Bones)
"Pilot" (Boomerang) (American)
"Pilot" (Boomtown) (2002)
"Pilot" (Bo' Selecta!)
"Pilot" (Bosom Buddies)
"Pilot" (Boy Meets World)
"Pilot" (Bram & Alice)
"Pilot" (Brandi & Jarrod: Married to the Job)
"Pilot" (The Brave)
"Pilot" (Brave New World) (2020)
"Pilot" (Breaking Bad)
"Pilot" (Breaking In)
"Pilot" (Breaking News)
"Pilot" (Breakout Kings)
"Pilot" (Bret Michaels: Life as I Know It)
"Pilot" (The Brian Benben Show)
"Pilot" (The Bridge) (2013)
"Pilot" (Bringing up Jack)
"Pilot" (The Brink)
"Pilot" (Broke) (2020)
"Pilot" (Broken Badges)
"Pilot" (Brooklyn Nine-Nine)
"Pilot" (Brooklyn South)
"Pilot" (Brother's Keeper) (1998)
"Pilot" (The Brotherhood of Poland, New Hampshire)
"Pilot" (Brotherly Love) (1995)
"Pilot" (Brothers) (2009)
"Pilot" (Brutally Normal)
"Pilot (a.k.a. Heart of Texas)" (Buck James)
"Pilot" (Buddies)
"Pilot" (Buddy Faro)
"Pilot" (Buffalo Bill)
"Pilot" (The Building)
"Pilot" (Bunheads)
"Pilot" (Burden of Truth)
"Pilot" (Burn Notice)
"Pilot" (The Burning Zone)
"Pilot" (Busting Loose)
"Pilot" (Buzzkill)
"Pilot" (The Byrds of Paradise)

C 

"Pilot" (Café Americain)
"Caged pilot" (Caged)
"Pilot" (Cagney & Lacey)
"Pilot" (Californication)
"The Pilot" (Call Me Fitz)
"Pilot" (Call to Glory)
"Pilot" (Call Your Mother)
"Pilot" (Camp)
"Pilot" (Camp Lazlo)
"Pilot" (Camping) (American)
"Pilot" (Campus)
"Pilot" (Campus Ladies)
"Pilot" (Can't Hurry Love)
"Pilot" (Cane)
"Pilot" (Canterbury's Law)
"Pilot" (The Cape) (1996)
"Pilot" (The Cape) (2011)
"Pilot" (Capital News)
"Pilot" (Caprica)
"Pilot" (The Carmichael Show)
"Pilot" (Carol's Second Act)
"The Pilot" (Caroline in the City)
"Pilot" (The Carrie Diaries)
"Pilot" (Cashmere Mafia)
"Pilot" (Casual)
"Pilot" (The Catch)
"Pilot" (Cavemen)
"Pilot" (Cedar Cove)
"Pilot" (Center of the Universe)
"Pilot" (Century City)
"Pilot" (Chad)
"Pilot" (Champions) (American)
"Pilot" (CHAOS)
"Pilot" (Charles in Charge)
"Pilot" (Charlie & Co.)
"Pilot" (Charlie Grace)
"Take Me to the Pilot" (Charlie Grace)
"Pilot" (Charlie's Angels)
"Pilot" (Charmed) (2018)
"Pilot" (Chase) (1973)
"Pilot" (Chase) (2010)
"Pilot" (Chasing Life)
"Pilot" (Cheer Perfection)
"Pilot" (The Chelsea Handler Show)
"Pilot" (Cheyenne Cinnamon and the Fantabulous Unicorn of Sugar Town Candy Fudge)
"Pilot episode" (Cheyenne Cinnamon and the Fantabulous Unicorn of Sugar Town Candy Fudge)
"Pilot" (The Chi)
"Pilot" (The Chicago Code)
"Pilot" (Chicago Fire)
"Pilot" (Chicago Hope)
"Pilot" (Chicago Sons)
"Pilot" (Chicken Soup)
"Pilot" (Chico and the Man)
"Pilots" (China, IL)
"Unaired pilot" (China, IL)
"Pilot" (China Beach)
"Pilot" (Chopper One)
"Pilot" (Chozen)
"Pilot" (The Chronicle)
"Pilot: City" (City)
"Pilot Episode" (City of Angels) (2000)
"Pilot" (Clarence) (American)
"Pilot" (The Class)
"Pilot" (Class of '96)
"Pilot" (The Cleaner) (American)
"Pilot" (The Cleveland Show)
"Pilot" (The Client)
"Pilot" (Clipped)
"Pilot" (Close to Home) (2005)
"Pilot" (The Closer)
"Pilot" (The Closer) (1998)
"Pilot" (Clubhouse)
"Pilot" (Co-Ed Fever)
"Pilot" (Coach)
"Pilot" (Code Black)
"Second pilot" (Code of Vengeance)
"Pilots" (Codename: Kids Next Door)
"Pilot Episode" (Cold Case Files)
"Pilot" (Cold Feet)
"Pilot" (Cold Feet) (American)
"Pilot" (Colony)
"Pilot" (Columbo)
"Pilot" (Come Back Mrs. Noah)
"Pilot" (The Comedians) (2015)
"Pilot" (Commander in Chief)
"The Pilot Episode" (Committed) (American)
"Pilot" (Common Law) (1996)
"Pilot" (Common Law) (2012)
"Pilot" (Community)
"Pilot" (The Company You Keep)
"Pilot" (Complete Savages)
"Pilot" (Complications)
"Pilot" (Connecting)
"Pilot" (Conrad Bloom)
"Pilot" (Constantine)
"Pilot" (Containment)
"Pilot" (Conviction) (2006)
"Pilot" (Conviction) (2016)
"Pilot" (The Cool Kids)
"Pilot" (Cop Rock)
"Pilot" (Cos)
"Pilot" (Cosby)
"Pilot" (The Cosby Show)
"Pilot" (Costello)
"Pilot" (Cougar Town)
"Pilot" (Council of Dads)
"Pilot" (Courage the Cowardly Dog)
"Pilot" (Courthouse)
"Pilot" (Cover Up)
"Pilot" (Covert Affairs)
"Pilot" (Cow and Chicken)
"Pilot" (Cracking Up)
"Unaired Pilot" (Cracking Up)
"Pilot" (Craig of the Creek)
"Pilot" (Crazy Like a Fox)
"Pilot" (The Crazy Ones)
"The New Pilot, Literally" (The Crew) (1995)
"Pilot" (Criminal Minds: Beyond Borders)
"Pilot" (Criminal Minds: Suspect Behavior)
"Pilot" (Crisis)
"Pilot" (Cristela)
"Pilot" (The Critic)
"Pilot" (The Crocodile Hunter)
"Pilot" (The Crocodile Hunter Diaries)
"Pilot" (The Crossing)
"Pilot" (Crossing Jordan)
"Pilot" (Crossing Lines)
"Pilot" (Crossroads) (1992)
"Pilot" (Crowded)
"Pilot" (Crumbs)
"Pilot" (CSI: Crime Scene Investigation)
"Pilot" (CSI: Cyber)
"Pilot" (CSI: Miami)
"Pilot" (CSI: NY)
"Pilot" (Cupid) (1998)
"Pilot" (Cupid) (2009)
"Pilot" (Cursed) (2000)
"Pilot" (Cutter to Houston)
"Pilot" (Cutters)
”Pilot” (Cyberchase)

D 

"Pilot" (D.C.)
"Pilot" (Daddy's Girls) (1994)
"Pilot" (Dads) (2013)
"Pilot" (DAG) (American)
"Pilot" (Damon)
"Pilot" (Dangerous Minds)
"Pilot" (Danny)
"Pilot" (Dark Angel) (American)
"Pilot" (Dark Blue)
"Pilot" (Dave's World)
"Pilot" (Dawson's Creek)
"Pilot" (Day Break)
"Pilot" (Daytime Divas)
"Pilot" (Dead Last)
"Pilot" (Dead Like Me)
"Pilot" (Dead to Me)
"Pilot" (Deadline) (2000)
"Pilot" (Dear John) (American)
"Pilot" (Death Valley)
"Pilot" (Debris)
"Pilot" (Deception) (2013 American)
"Pilot" (Deception) (2018)
"Pilot" (The Deep End)
"Pilot" (Defiance)
"Pilot" (Defying Gravity)
"Pilot" (Dellaventura)
"Pilot" (Delocated)
"Pilot" (Designated Survivor)
"Pilot" (Desperate Housewives)
"Pilot" (Desperate Housewives Africa)
"Pilot" (Desus & Mero) (2016)
"Pilot" (Detroit 1-8-7)
"Pilot" (The Deuce)
"Pilot" (Devious Maids)
"Pilots" (Dexter's Laboratory)
"Pilot" (Dharma & Greg)
"Pilot" (Diagnosis: Murder)
"Pilot" (Dietland)
"Pilot" (A Different World)
"Pilot" (Dig)
"Pilot" (DiResta)
"Pilot" (Dirk Gently)
"Pilot" (Dirt)
"Pilot" (Dirty Sexy Money)
"Pilot" (The District)
"The Pilot" (The Division)
"Pilot" (Divorce)
"Pilot" (DJ & the Fro)
"Pilot" (Do No Harm)
"Pilot" (Do Not Disturb)
"Pilot" (Do Over)
"Pilot" (Doc Elliot)
"1981 pilot" (Dollar a Second)
"Pilot" (Dolphin Cove)
"Pilot" (Dominion)
"Pilot" (Don't Trust the B---- in Apartment 23)
"Pilot" (Doogie Howser, M.D.)
"Pilot" (Doom Patrol)
"Pilot" (Dora and Friends: Into the City!)
"Pilot" (Dora the Explorer)
"Pilot" (Doubt) (American)
"Pilot" (The Downer Channel)
"Pilot" (Dr. Ken)
"Pilot" (Dr. Quinn, Medicine Woman)
"Pilot" (Dr. Vegas)
"Pilot" (Drake & Josh)
"Pilot" (The Drew Carey Show)
"Pilot" (The Drinky Crow Show)
"Unaired Pilot" (Drive) (2007)
"Pilot" (Drop Dead Diva)
"Pilot" (Due South)
"Pilot" (The Dumplings)
"Pilot" (Duncanville)
"Pilot" (Dweebs)

E 

"Pilot: Parts 1 & 2" (E/R)
"Pilot" (E-Ring)
"Pilot" (Early Edition)
"Pilot" (East New York)
"Pilot" (Eastwick)
"Pilot" (Easy Street)
"Pilot" (Ed)
"Pilot" (The Education of Max Bickford)
"Pilot" (Elementary)
"Pilot" (Ellen)
"Pilot" (The Ellen Burstyn Show)
"Pilot" (The Ellen Show)
"Pilot" (Emergence)
"Pilot" (Emily Owens, M.D.)
"Pilot" (Emily's Reasons Why Not)
"Pilot" (Empire) (2015)
"Pilot" (Empty Nest)
"Pilot" (Encore! Encore!)
"Pilot" (The Endgame)
"Pilot" (Enlightened)
"Pilot" (Enlisted)
"Pilot" (The Enemy Within)
"Pilot" (The Eric Andre Show)
"Pilot" (Euphoria) (American)
"Pilot" (Eureka) (American)
"Pilot" (The Evidence)
"Series 1 Pilot" (The Evermoor Chronicles)
"Pilot" (Everwood)
"Everybody Hates The Pilot" (Everybody Hates Chris)
"Pilot" (Everybody Loves Raymond)
"Pilot" (The Exes)
"Pilot" (Eyes)
"Pilot" (EZ Streets)

F 

"Pilot" (The Face Is Familiar)
"Pilot" (Factory)
"Pilot" (Fairly Legal)
"Pilot" (Faking It) (American)
"Pilot" (The Fall Guy)
"Pilot" (Fam)
"Pilot: The Best Years" (Family) (1976)
"Pilot" (The Family) (2016)
"Pilot" (Family Affair) (2002)
"Pilot" (Family Album) (1993)
"Pilot" (Family Law) (American)
"Pilot" (The Family Man) (American)
"Pilot" (Family Ties)
"Pilot" (Family Tools)
"Pilot" (Famous in Love)
"Pilot" (The Famous Teddy Z)
"Pilot" (The Fanelli Boys)
"Pilot" (Fantasy Island) (1998)
"Pilot" (Fashion Star)
"Pilot" (Fast Times)
"Pilot" (Fastlane)
"Original Pilot" (Father of the Pride)
"Pilot" (FBI)
"Pilot" (FBI: International)
"Backdoor pilot" (FBI: Most Wanted)
"Pilot" (Fear the Walking Dead)
"Pilot Light" (Feed the Beast)
"Pilot" (Felicity)
"Pilot" (Ferris Bueller)
"Pilot" (Feud)
"Pilot" (The Fighting Fitzgeralds)
"Pilot: Part 1" (Filthy Rich) (1982)
"Pilot: Part 2" (Filthy Rich) (1982)
"Pilot" (Filthy Rich) (2020)
"Pilot" (Final Space)
"Pilot" (Finding Carter)
"Pilot" (Fire Country)
"Pilot" (Fired Up)
"Pilot/Chapter Two" (The Firm) (2012)
"Pilot" (The First Family)
"Pilot" (First Time Out)
"Pilot" (First Wives Club)
"Pilot" (The Fix) (2019)
"Pilot" (The Flash) (1990)
"Pilot" (The Flash) (2014)
"Pilot" (Flash Gordon) (2007)
"Pilot" (Flipper) (1995)
"Pilot" (Florida Girls)
"Pilot" (Flying Blind)
"Pilot" (The Following)
"Pilot" (For Life)
"Pilot" (For the People) (2002)
"Pilot" (For the People) (2018)
"Pilot" (For Your Love)
"Pilot" (Forever) (2014)
"Pilot" (The Forgotten)
"Unaired pilot" (The Forgotten)
"Pilot" (The Fosters) (American)
"Pilot" (Four Kings)
"Pilot" (Frank's Place)
"Pilot" (Franklin & Bash)
"Pilot" (Frannie's Turn)
"Pilot" (Freaks and Geeks)
"Pilot" (FreakyLinks)
"Pilot" (Free Agents) (American)
"Pilot" (Free Spirit)
"Pilot" (Freedom)
"Pilot" (Freddie)
"Pilot" (Frequency)
"Pilot" (Fresh Off the Boat)
"Pilot" (Freshman Dorm)
"Pilot" (Friday Night Lights)
"The Pilot" (Friends)
"Pilot" (Friends with Benefits)
"Pilot" (Friends with Better Lives)
"Pilot" (Fringe)
"Pilot" (From Dusk till Dawn: The Series)
"Space Pilot 3000" (Futurama)
"Pilot" (Future Man)

G 

"Backdoor pilot" (The Game) (American)
"Pilot" (Game of Silence) (American)
"Pilot" (Gang Related)
"Pilot" (Gary Unmarried)
"Pilot" (The Gates)
"Pilot" (Galavant)
"Pilot" (GCB)
"Pilot" (The Geena Davis Show)
"Pilot" (Generation) (2021)
"Pilot" (George) (1993)
"Pilot" (George and Leo)
"Pilot" (The Get Along Gang)
"Pilot" (Get Real) (American)
"Pilot" (Get Smart) (1995)
"Pilot" (The Ghost & Mrs. Muir)
"Pilot" (Ghost Whisperer)
"Pilot" (Ghost Asylum)
"Pilot" (Ghosted)
"Pilot" (Ghosts) (2021)
"Pilot" (A Gifted Man)
"Pilot" (Gigantic)
"Pilot" (Gilligan's Island)
"Backdoor pilot" (Gilmore Girls)
"Pilot" (Gilmore Girls)
"Pilot" (Ginny & Georgia)
"Pilot" (Girlfriends) (2000)
"Pilot" (Girls)
"Pilot" (The Girls Next Door: The Bunny House)
"Pilot" (Girls5eva)
"Pilot" (The Glades)
"Pilot" (Glam Fairy)
"Pilot" (Glee)
"Pilot" (Glory Daze)
"Pilot" (Go On)
"Pilot" (God Friended Me)
"Pilot" (Golden Boy) (American)
"Pilot" (Gone)
"Pilot" (Good & Evil)
"Pilot" (Good Advice)
"Pilot" (Good Dog)
"Pilot" (Good Girls)
"Pilot" (Good Girls Revolt)
"Pilot" (The Good Guys) (2010)
"Pilot" (The Good Life) (1994)
"Pilot" (Good Morning, Miami)
"Pilot" (Good Morning, Miss Bliss)
"Pilot" (Good News)
"Pilot" (Good Sam)
"Pilot" (Good Vibes) (American)
"Pilot" (The Good Wife)
"Pilot" (The Goode Family)
"Pilot" (Goodnight, Beantown)
"Pilot" (The Goodwin Games)
"Pilot" (Gossip Girl)
"Pilot" (Gotham)
"Pilot" (Grace Under Fire)
"Pilot" (Grand Crew)
"Pilot" (Grand Hotel)
"Pilot" (Grand Slam)
"Pilot" (Grandfathered)
"Pilot" (Grapevine)
"Pilot" (The Great Indoors)
"Pilot" (Great News)
"Pilot" (Great Scott!)
"Pilot" (The Greenhouse Academy)
"Pilot" (Greetings from Tucson)
"Pilot" (Greg the Bunny)
"Pilot" (The Gregory Hines Show)
"Pilot" (Greek)
"Pilot" (Grimm)
"Pilot" (The Grinder)
"Pilot" (Grosse Pointe)
"Pilot" (Ground Floor)
"Pilot" (Growing Pains)
"Pilot" (Growing Up Fisher)
"Pilot" (Grown Ups) (1999)
"Backdoor pilot" (Grown-ish)
"Pilot" (The Guardian)
"Pilot" (Guess Who Died)
"Pilot" (Guilt) (American)
"Pilot" (Gumby)
"Pilot" (Gung Ho)
"Pilot" (Guys Like Us)
"Pilot" (Guys with Kids)

H 

"Pilot" (Hack)
"Pilot" (Hagen)
"The Big Pilot Episode" (Half & Half)
"Pilot" (Hand of God)
"Pilot" (The Handler)
"Pilot" (Hang Time)
"Pilot" (Hank) (2009)
"Pilot" (Happily Divorced)
"Pilot" (Happy Endings)
"Pilot" (Happy Hour)
"Pilot" (Happy Together) (American)
"Pilot" (Happyland)
"Pilot" (The Hard Times of RJ Berger)
"Pilot" (Hardball) (1994)
"Pilot #1" (Hardcore Pawn)
"Pilot #2" (Hardcore Pawn)
"Pilot episodes" (Hardcore Pawn)
"Pilot" (Harry Hill's TV Burp)
"Pilot" (Harry's Law)
"Pilot" (Harsh Realm)
"Pilot" (Hart of Dixie)
"Pilot" (The Harvey Korman Show)
"Pilot" (The Hat Squad)
"Pilot" (Haunted) (2002)
"Pilot" (The Haunted Hathaways)
"Pilot" (Hawaii Five-0) (2010)
"Pilot" (Hawthorne)
"Pilot" (Head Cases)
"Pilot" (Head of the Class)
"Pilot" (Head of the Class) (2021)
"Pilot" (Head over Heels) (American)
"Pilot" (HeartBeat) (1988)
"Pilot" (Heartbeat) (2016)
"Pilot" (Heartland) (2007 American)
"Pilot" (Heathers)
"Pilot" (Heist)
"Pilot" (Helix)
"Pilot" (Hell on Wheels)
"Pilot" (Hello Ladies)
"Pilot" (Hello, Larry)
"Pilot" (The Help)
"Pilot" (Help Me Help You)
"Pilot" (Here and Now) (1992)
"Pilot" (Herman's Head)
"Pilot" (Hey Arnold!)
"Pilot" (Hey Dad..!)
"Pilot" (Hi Hi Puffy AmiYumi)
"Pilot" (Hi-de-Hi!)
"Pilot" (Hit-Monkey)
"Pilot" (Hidden Hills)
"Pilot" (Hidden Palms)
"Pilot" (The High Fructose Adventures of Annoying Orange)
"Pilot" (High Incident)
"Pilot" (The High Life) (British)
"Scott Free/Pilot" (Higher Ground)
"Pilot" (Hi Hi Puffy AmiYumi)
"Pilot" (Hiller and Diller)
"Pilot" (Hindsight)
"Pilot" (His & Hers)
"Pilot" (Hit the Floor)
"Pilot" (Hitz)
"Pilot episode" (Hogan's Heroes)
"Pilot" (Holding the Baby) (American)
"Pilot" (Holly's World)
"Pilot" (The Home Court)
"Pilot" (Home Economics)
"Pilot" (Home Free) (1993)
"Pilot" (Home Improvement)
"Pilot" (Homeland)
"Pilot" (Homeroom)
"Pilot" (Hometown)
"The Pilot" (Hoops)
"Pilot" (Hope & Faith)
"Pilot" (Hostages) (American)
"Pilot" (Hot Properties)
"Pilot" (Hot in Cleveland)
"Pilot" (Hot Streets)
"Pilot" (House)
"Pilot" (House Rules) (1998)
"Pilot" (Houston Beauty)
"Pilot" (How I Met Your Mother)
"Pilot" (How to Be a Gentleman)
"Pilot" (How to Get Away with Murder)
"Pilot" (How to Live with Your Parents (For the Rest of Your Life))
"Pilot" (How to Make It in America)
"Pilot" (How We Roll)
"Pilot/102" (Howie Do It)
"Pilot" (Hudson Street)
"Pilot" (Huff)
"Pilot" (The Hughleys)
"Pilot" (The Human Factor)
"Pilot" (Human Target) (1992)
"Pilot" (Human Target) (2010)
"Pilot" (Hung)
"Pilot" (Hyperion Bay)

I 

"Pilot" (I Am Frankie)
"Pilot" (I Am the Night)
"Pilot" (I Didn't Do It)
"The Pilot" (I Didn't Do It)
"Pilot" (I Hate My Teenage Daughter)
"Pilot" (I Heart Davao)
"Pilot" (I Just Want My Pants Back)
"Pilot" (I'll Fly Away)
"Pilot" (I'm Dying Up Here)
"Pilot" (I'm with Her)
"iPilot" (iCarly)
"Pilot" (iZombie)
"Pilot" (Idiotsitter)
"Pilot" (Imaginary Mary)
"Pilot" (Impulse)
"Pilot" (In a Heartbeat)
"Pilot" (In Case of Emergency)
"Pilot" (In Justice)
"Pilot" (In Plain Sight)
"Pilot" (In the Beginning)
"Pilot" (In the Dark) (American)
"Pilot: Part 1" (In the Heat of the Night)
"Pilot: Part 2" (In the Heat of the Night)
"Pilot" (In-Laws)
"Pilot" (The Inbetweeners) (American)
"Pilot" (Inconceivable)
"Pilot" (Incredible Crew)
"Bonggang Pilot" (Inday Will Always Love You)
"Everybody's Talking About the Pilot" (Indebted)
"Pilot" (Infinity Train)
"Pilot" (Insatiable)
"Pilot" (Inside Schwartz)
"Pilot" (Inspector Gadget) (1983)
"Pilot" (Inspector George Gently)
"Pilot" (Instant Mom)
"Pilot" (Instinct) (American)
"Pilot" (Intelligence) (American)
"Pilot" (Invader Zim)
"Pilot" (Invasion) (American)
"Pilot" (The Invisible Man) (2000)
"Pilot" (Ironside) (2013)
"Pilot" (It Had to Be You)
"Pilot" (It's a Living)
"Pilot" (It's All Relative)
"Pilot" (It's Like, You Know...)
"Pilot" (It's Not Easy)
"Pilot" (It's Your Move)

J 

"Pilot" (J.J. Starbuck)
"Pilot" (Jack & Bobby)
"Pilot" (Jack and Mike)
"Pilot" (Jack Ryan)
"Pilot" (Jake and the Fatman)
"Pilot" (The Jake Effect)
"Pilot" (Jake in Progress)
"Pilot" (The Jamie Foxx Show)
"Pilot" (Jane by Design)
"Pilot" (Jane the Virgin)
"Pilot series" (Jay Jay the Jet Plane)
"Pilot" (Jean-Claude Van Johnson)
"Pilot" (Jennifer Falls)
"Pilot" (Jennifer Slept Here)
"Pilot" (Jenny)
"Pilot" (Jericho)
"Pilot" (Jesse Hawkes)
"The Pilot" (Jessie) (1984)
"Pilot" (The Jim Gaffigan Show)
"Pilot" (Joan of Arcadia)
"Pilot" (The Job) (2001)
"Pilot" (Joey)
"Pilot" (John Doe)
"Pilots" (Johnny Bravo)
"Pilot" (Joking Apart)
"Pilot" (Jonny Zero)
"Pilot" (Juan Happy Love Story)
"Pilot" (Judging Amy)
"Pilot" (The Jury)
"Pilot" (Just Legal)
"Pilot" (Just Our Luck)
"Pilot" (Justice) (2006)

K 

"Pilot" (K.C. Undercover)
"Pilot" (K-Ville)
"Pilot" (The Kandi Factory)
"Pilot" (Kate Brasher)
"Pilot" (Kath & Kim) (American)
"Pilot (a.k.a. Eddie)" (Keen Eddie)
"Pilot" (Kenan)
"Pilot" (Kenan & Kel)
"Pilot" (Kevin Can Wait)
"Pilot" (Kevin from Work)
"Pilot" (Kevin Hill)
"Pilot" (Kevin (Probably) Saves the World)
"Pilot" (Key West)
"Pilot" (The Kicks)
"Pilot" (Kidnapped) (American)
"Pilot" (The Kids Are Alright)
"Pilot" (Killer Instinct)
"Pilot" (The Killing) (American)
"Pilot" (King & Maxwell)
"Lost pilot" (King of Cars)
"Pilot" (King of the Hill)
"Pilot" (The King of Queens)
"Pilot" (King Star King)
"Pilot" (Kingpin)
"Pilot" (Kirstie)
"Pilot" (The Knights of Prosperity)
"Pilot" (Knots Landing)
"Pilot" (Kojak) (2005)
"Pilot" (Kristin)
"Pilot" (Krypton)
"Pilot" (Kung Fu) (2021)
"Pilot" (Kyle XY)

L 

"Pilot" (L.A. Doctors)
"Pilot" (L.A. Firefighters)
"Pilot" (L.A.'s Finest)
"Pilot" (LA to Vegas)
"Pilot" (The L Word)
"Pilot" (La Brea)
"Pilot" (Ladies Man) (1999)
"Pilot" (Ladies' Man) (1980)
"Pilot" (Lady Blue)
"Pilot" (Lady Dynamite)
"Pilot" (Las Vegas)
"Pilot" (The Last Frontier)
"Pilot" (Last Man Standing) (American)
"Pilot" (The Last O.G.)
"Pilot" (The Last Resort) (American)
"Pilot" (The Last Tycoon)
"Pilot" (LateLine)
"Pilot" (Laurie Hill)
"Pilot" (LAX)
"Pilot" (Leap of Faith)
"Pilot" (The Leftovers)
"Pilot" (Legends)
"Pilot" (Legends of Tomorrow)
"Pilot" (Legit) (2013)
"Unaired Pilot" (Lenny)
"Pilot" (Less than Perfect)
"Pilot" (Let the Love Begin)
"Pilot" (Lethal Weapon)
"Pilot" (Lie to Me)
"Pilot: Merit Badge" (Life) (American)
"Pilot" (Life as We Know It)
"Pilot Junior" (Life as We Know It)
"Pilot" (Life in Pieces)
"Pilot" (Life Is Wild)
"Pilot" (Life on a Stick)
"Pilot" (Life Sentence)
"Pilot" (Life Unexpected)
"Pilot" (Life with Bonnie)
"Pilot" (Life with Roger)
"Pilot" (Life's Work)
"Pilot" (Lights Out) (2011)
"Pilot" (Like Family)
"Pilot" (Likely Suspects)
"Pilot" (Lime Street)
"Pilot" (Limitless)
"Pilot" (Lincoln Heights)
"Pilot" (Lincoln Rhyme: Hunt for the Bone Collector)
"Pilot" (Line of Fire) (2003)
"Pilot" (The Lion Guard)
"Pilot" (Lipstick Jungle)
"Pilot" (Listen Up!)
"Pilot" (Little Chocolatiers)
"Pilot" (Live-In)
"Pilot" (The Liver Birds)
"Pilot" (Living Biblically)
"Pilot" (Living with Fran)
"Pilot" (Little Britain)
"Pilot" (Liza on Demand)
"Pilot" (Lois & Clark: The New Adventures of Superman)
"Pilot" (The Lone Gunmen)
"Pilot" (Lone Star)
"Pilot" (Long Live the Royals)
"Pilot" (Longmire)
"Pilot" (Longstreet)
"Pilot" (The Loop) (American)
"Pilot" (Lopez vs Lopez)
"Pilot" (Lost)
"Pilot" (Lost at Home)
"Original unaired pilot" (Lost in Space)
"Pilot" (The Lottery)
"Pilot" (Louie)
"Pilot" (Love & Money)
"Pilot (a.k.a. Love Is Hell)" (Love & War)
"Pilot" (Love and Marriage) (1996)
"Pilot" (Love Bites)
"Pilot" (Love Monkey)
"Pilot" (Love on a Rooftop)
"Pilot" (Love That Girl!)
"Pilot" (Love Thy Neighbour) (1972)
"The Pilot" (Love Thy Neighbour) (1972)
"Pilot" (Love, Inc.)
"Pilot" (Lovespring International)
"Pilot" (Low Winter Sun) (American)
"Pilot" (Luck)
"Pilot" (Lucky)
"Pilot" (Lucky 7)
"Pilot" (Lucky Feller)
"Pilot" (Lucky Louie)
"Pilot" (Lucifer)
"Pilot" (Luis)
"Pilot" (The Lying Game)
"Pilot" (The Lyon's Den)

M 

"Pilot" (M*A*S*H)
"Pilot" (MacGyver) (1985)
"Pilot" (Mad Dogs) (American)
"Pilot" (Madam Secretary)
"Pilot" (Made in Jersey)
"Pilot" (Madigan Men)
"Pilot" (Maggie) (1998)
"Pilot" (The Magician) (American)
"Pilot" (Make It or Break It)
"Pilot" (Making History)
"Pilot" (Making the Grade)
"Pilot" (Malcolm & Eddie)
"Pilot" (Malcolm in the Middle)
"Pilot" (Malibu Country)
"Pilot" (Malibu Shores)
"Pilot" (Mama Malone)
"Pilot" (Mama's Boy)
"Pilot" (Man Up!)
"Pilot" (Man of the People)
"Pilot" (Man with a Plan)
"Pilot" (Manhattan Love Story)
"Pilot" (Manifest)
"Pilot" (Marcus Welby, M.D.)
"Pilot" (Marker)
"Pilot" (Marlon)
"Pilot" (Married)
"Pilot" (Married to the Kellys)
"Pilot" (Married... with Children)
"Pilot" (Marry Me) (American)
"Pilot" (The Marshal)
"Pilot" (The Marvelous Misadventures of Flapjack)
"Pilot" (The Marvelous Mrs. Maisel)
"Pilot" (Marvin Marvin)
"Pilot" (Mary + Jane)
"Pilot" (Masquerade)
"Pilot" (Masters of Sex)
"Pilot" (Matlock)
"Pilot" (Maximum Bob)
"Pilot" (Maximum Security)
"The Pilot Episode" (Maybe It's Me)
"Pilot" (The Mayor)
"Pilot" (The McCarthys)
"Pilot" (Me and the Boys)
"Pilot" (Me Mammy)
"Pilot" (Meant to Be)
"Pilot" (Medical Center)
"Pilot" (Medical Investigation)
"Pilot" (Medicine Ball)
"Pilot" (Medium)
"Pilot" (Meego)
"Pilot" (Meet the Wife)
"Pilot" (Megas XLR)
"Pilot" (Melissa & Joey)
"Pilot" (Melrose Place)
"Pilot" (Melrose Place) (2009)
"Pilot" (Men, Women & Dogs)
"Pilot" (Men at Work)
"Pilot" (Men in Trees)
"Pilot" (Men of a Certain Age)
"Pilot" (Mental)
"Pilot" (The Mentalist)
"Pilot" (Method & Red)
"Pilot" (Miami Medical)
"Pilot" (Michael Hayes)
"Pilot" (The Michael J. Fox Show)
"Pilot" (The Michael Richards Show)
"Pilot" (The Mick)
"Pilot" (Mickey Mouse Clubhouse)
"Pilot" (The Middle)
"The Pilot Episode Sanction" (The Middleman)
"Pilot" (Midnight, Texas)
"Television pilot" (Midwest Teen Sex Show)
"Pilot" (Mighty Magiswords)
"Pilot" (Mike, Lu & Og)
"Pilot" (Mike & Molly)
"Pilot" (Millennium)
"Pilot" (The Millers)
"Pilot" (A Million Little Things)
"Pilot" (Mind Games)
"Pilot" (A Mind to Kill)
"Pilot" (The Mindy Project)
"Pilot" (Minoriteam)
"Pilot" (Minority Report)
"Pilot" (A Minute with Stan Hooper)
"Pilot" (Misery Loves Company)
"Pilot" (Miss Match)
"Pilot" (Missing)
"Pilot" (Missing Persons)
"Pilot" (The Mist)
"Pilot" (Mister Sterling)
"Pilot" (Mistresses) (American)
"Pilot" (Mixology)
"Pilot" (The Mob Doctor)
"Pilot" (Mobbed)
"Pilot" (Models Inc.)
"Pilot" (Modern Family)
"Pilot" (Modern Men)
"Pilot" (Moesha)
"Pilot" (Molloy)
"Pilot" (Mom)
"Pilot" (The Mommies)
"Pilot" (Monday Mornings)
"Pilot" (Monty)
"Pilot" (The Moodys) (American)
"Pilot" (Moon Over Miami)
"Pilot" (Moonlighting)
"Pilot" (Mork & Mindy)
"Pilot" (Morton & Hayes)
"Pilot" (Mother Up!)
"Pilot" (Motherland)
"Pilot" (The Mountain)
"Pilot" (Movie Stars)
"Pilot" (Mozart in the Jungle)
"Pilot" (Mr. & Mrs. Smith)
"Pilot" (Mr. Belvedere)
"Pilot" (Mr. Box Office)
"Pilot" (Mr. Deeds Goes to Town)
"Pilot" (My Korean Jagiya)
"Pilot" (Mr. Mayor)
"Pilot" (Mr. Meaty)
"Pilot" (Mr. Mercedes)
"Pilot" (Mr. Men and Little Miss)
"Pilot" (Mr. Merlin)
"Pilot" (Mr. President)
"Pilot" (Mr. Robinson)
"Pilot" (Mr. Sunshine) (1986)
"Pilot" (Mr. Sunshine) (2011)
"Pilot" (Muscle)
"Pilot" (Mutt & Stuff)
"Pilot" (Mulaney)
"Pilots" (The Muppet Show)
"Pilot" (Murder in the First)
"Pilot" (My Boys)
"Pilot" (My Generation)
"Pilot" (My Guide to Becoming a Rock Star)
"Pilots" (My Gym Partner's a Monkey)
"Pilot" (My Name Is Earl)
"Pilot" (My So-Called Life)
"Pilot" (My Two Dads)
"Pilot" (My Wife and Kids)
"Pilot" (The Mysteries of Laura)
"Pilot" (Mystery Girls)
"Pilot episodes" (MythBusters)
"Pilot" (Mythic Quest)

N 

"Pilot" (The Naked Brothers Band)
"Pilot" (Nancy Drew) (2019)
"Pilot" (Nashville) (2012)
"Pilot" (Nathan Barley)
"Backdoor pilots" (NCIS)
"Pilot" (NCIS: Hawaiʻi)
"Pilot" (Necessary Roughness)
"Pilot" (Ned and Stacey)
"Pilot" (Ned's Declassified School Survival Guide)
"Pilots" (Ned's Declassified School Survival Guide)
"Pilot" (The Neighborhood)
"Pilot" (The Neighbors) (2012)
"Pilot" (Never Have I Ever)
"Pilot" (The Nevers)
"Pilot" (The New Adventures of Old Christine)
"Pilot" (New Amsterdam) (2008)
"Pilot" (New Amsterdam) (2018)
"Pilot" (New Attitude)
"Pilot" (New Girl)
"Pilot" (The New Normal)
"Pilot" (New York Undercover)
"Pilot" (NewsRadio)
"Pilot" (Next Caller)
"Pilot" (Nicky, Ricky, Dicky & Dawn)
"Pilot" (Night Gallery)
"Pilot" (The Night Shift)
"Pilot" (Night Court) (2023)
"Pilot" (Night Stalker)
"Pilot" (Nightmare Cafe)
"Pilot" (Nikita)
"Pilot" (The Nine)
"Pilot" (The Nine Lives of Chloe King)
"Pilot Episodes" (Ninjago)
"Pilot" (Nip/Tuck)
"Pilot" (The No. 1 Ladies' Detective Agency)
"No Ordinary Pilot" (No Ordinary Family)
"Pilot" (No Ordinary Family)
"Pilot" (No Tomorrow)
"Pilot" (North Shore)
"Pilot" (Northern Exposure)
"Pilot" (Not Dead Yet)
"Pilot" (Notes from the Underbelly)
"Pilot" (Notorious) (2016)
"Pilot" (Numbers)
"Pilot" (Nurse) (1981)
"Pilot" (Nurse Jackie)
"Son of a Pilot" (Nurses) (American)
"Pilot" (The Nutt House)
"Pilot" (NYC 22)
"Pilot" (NYPD Blue)

O 

"Pilot" (The O.C.)
"Pilot" (OK K.O.! Let's Be Heroes)
"Pilot" (October Road)
"The Pilot" (The Odd Couple) (2015)
"Pilot" (Odyssey 5)
"Pilot" (Off the Rack)
"Pilot" (The Office) (American)
"Pilot: The Office" (The Office) (1995)
"Pilot" (Oh, Doctor Beeching!)
"Pilot" (Oh, Grow Up)
"Pilot" (Oh Baby)
"Pilot" (Oh No It's Selwyn Froggitt)
"Pilot" (Ohara)
"Pilot (a.k.a. At the End of the Long Arm is a Glad Hand)" (The Oldest Rookie)
"Pilot" (On Our Own) (1994)
"Pilot" (On the Spot) (2003)
"Pilot" (Once Upon a Kiss)
"Pilot" (Once Upon a Time)
"Pilot" (One Big Happy)
"Pilot" (One Mississippi)
"Pilot" (One of Us Is Lying)
"Pilot" (The One That Got Away) (Philippine)
"Pilot" (One Tree Hill)
"Pilot" (Opposite Sex)
"Pilot" (The Originals)
"Pilot: Parts 1 & 2" (Orleans)
"Pilot" (The Other Two)
"Pilot" (The Others)
"Pilot" (Out All Night)
"Pilot (Part One)" (Out of Order)
"Pilot (Part Two)" (Out of Order)
"Pilot" (Out of Practice)
"Pilot" (Out of the Blue) (1996)
"Pilot" (Outer Banks)
"Pilot" (Outlaw)
"Pilot" (Outmatched)
"Pilot" (The Outsiders) (American)
"Pilot" (Outsourced)
"Pilot" (Over the Garden Wall)
"Pilot" (Over the Top)
"Pilot" (Over There) (American)

P 

"Pilot" (P.S. I Luv U)
"Pilot" (Pacific Blue)
"Pilot" (Pacific Station)
"Pilot" (Painkiller Jane)
"Pilot" (Pamilya Roces)
"Pilot" (Pan Am)
"Pilot" (Parenthood) (1990)
"Pilot" (Parenthood) (2010)
"Pilot" (Parker Lewis Can't Lose)
"Pilot" (Parks and Recreation)
"Pilot" (Partners) (1995)
"Pilot" (Partners) (2012)
"Pilot" (Partners in Crime) (American)
"Pilot" (Party Girl) (1996)
"Pilot" (Party of Five)
"Pilot" (Party of Five) (2020)
"Pilot" (Pasadena)
"Pilot" (The Passage)
"Pilot" (Past Life)
"Pilot" (The Patty Duke Show)
"Pilot" (Pauly)
"Pilot" (Peacemakers)
"Pilot" (Pearl)
"Backdoor pilot" (Pearson)
"Pilot" (People of Earth)
"Pilot" (Pepper Dennis)
"Pilot" (Perception) (American)
"Pilot" (Perfect Couples)
"Pilot" (Perfect Hair Forever)
"Pilot" (Perfect Harmony)
"Pilot" (Person of Interest)
"Pilot" (Persons Unknown)
"Pilot" (Phenom)
"Pilot" (The Philanthropist)
"Pilot" (PhoneShop)
"Pilot" (Phyllis)
"Pilot" (Picket Fences)
"Pilot" (Pilgrim's Rest)
"Pilot" (Pinky Malinky)
"Pilot" (Pitch)
"Pilot" (The Pitts)
"The Pilot" (Planet Sheen)
"Pilot" (Platypus Man)
"Pilot" (The Playboy Club)
"Pilot" (The Player) (2015)
"Pilot" (Playing House)
"Pilot" (Plonsters)
"Pilot" (Point Pleasant)
"Pilot" (Political Animals)
"Pilot" (Ponderosa)
"Pilot" (The Popcorn Kid)
"Pilot" (Pose)
"Backdoor pilot" (Postcards from Buster)
"Pilot" (Powers) (American)
"Pilot" (The Practice)
"Pilot" (Preacher)
"Pilot" (The Preston Episodes)
"Pilot" (The Pretender)
"Pilot" (Pretty Little Liars)
"Pilot" (Pretty Little Liars: The Perfectionists)
"Pilot" (Pride & Joy)
"Pilot" (Princesses)
"Pilot" (Prime Suspect) (American)
"Pilot" (Private Eye)
"Backdoor pilot" (Private Practice)
"Pilot" (Privileged)
"Pilot" (Prison Break)
"Pilot" (The Problem Solverz)
"Pilot" (Prodigal Son)
"Pilot" (Profit)
"Pilot" (Proof) (2015)
"Pilot" (The Protector) (American)
"Pilot" (Proven Innocent)
"Pilot" (Providence) (American)
"Pilot" (Psych)
"Pilot" (Punky Brewster) (2021)
"Pilot" (Puppets Who Kill)
"Pilot" (Pure Genius)
"Pilot" (The Pursuit of Happiness)
"Pilot" (Push)
"Pie-lette" (Pushing Daisies)

Q 

"Pilot" (Quarterlife)
"Pilot" (Queen of the South)
"Piloto" (Queen of the South)
"Pilot" (Queens Supreme)
"Pilot" (Quintuplets)

R 

"Pilot" (Rags to Riches)
"Pilot" (Raines)
"Pilot" (Raising Dad)
"Pilot" (Raising Hope)
"Pilot" (Raising the Bar) (2008)
"Pilot" (The Random Years)
"Pilot" (Ratched)
"Original Pilot" (Raven) (1992)
"Backdoor pilot" (Ravenswood)
"Pilot" (Ravenswood)
"Pilot" (The Real O'Neals)
"Pilot" (Reaper)
"Pilot" (Reba)
"Pilot" (Rebel) (2017)
"Pilot" (Rebel) (2021)
"Pilot" (Reckless)
"Pilot" (Red Band Society)
"Pilot" (Red Oaks)
"Pilot" (Red Widow)
"Pilot" (Reef Break)
"Pilot" (Regular Show)
"Pilot" (Reign)
"Pilot" (Rel)
"Pilot" (Relativity)
"Theatrical pilot" (The Ren & Stimpy Show)
"Pilot" (Report to Murphy)
"Pilot" (The Republic of Sarah)
"Pilot" (Rescue 77)
"Pilot" (The Resident)
"Pilot" (Resident Alien)
"Pilot" (Retired at 35)
"Pilot" (The Return of Jezebel James)
"Pilot" (Reunited)
"Pilot" (Revenge)
"Pilot" (Revolution)
"Pilot" (Rhythm & Blues)
"Pilot" (The Riches)
"Pilot" (Rick and Morty)
"Pilot" (Ringer)
"Pilot" (Rise) (American)
"Pilot" (Rita Rocks)
"Pilot" (Roar) (1997)
"Pilot" (Rob)
"Pilot" (Roc)
"Pilot" (Rock Me Baby)
"Pilot" (Rocko's Modern Life)
"Pilot" (Roger Roger)
"Pilot" (The Rookie)
"Pilot" (The Rookie: Feds)
"Pilot" (Room for Two) (American)
"Pilot" (Roomies)
"Pilot" (Rosewood)
"Special/Pilot" (Rosie Live)
"Pilot" (Roswell)
"Pilot" (Roswell, New Mexico)
"Pilot" (The Royal Family)
"Pilot" (Royal Pains)
"Pilot" (Ruby & the Rockits)
"Pilot" (Rugrats)
"Pilot" (Rules of Engagement)
"Pilot" (Run of the House)
"Pilot" (Runaway) (2006)
"Pilot" (Running Wilde)
"Pilot" (Rush) (2008)
"Pilot" (Rush) (American)
"Pilot" (Rush Hour) (American)
"Pilot" (Ruthless)
"Pilot" (Rutherford Falls)
"Pilot" (Ryan Caulfield: Year One)
"Pilot" (Ryan Hansen Solves Crimes on Television)
"Pilot" (Ryan's Four)

S 

"Pilot" (S.W.A.T.) (2017)
"Pilot" (Sabrina the Teenage Witch) (1996)
"Pilot" (Salvation)
"#Pilot" (Sam & Cat)
"Pilot" (Samantha Who?)
"Pilot" (Sanford and Son)
"Pilot" (Satisfaction) (2014)
"Pilot" (Saul of the Mole Men)
"Pilot" (Saved by the Bell) (2020)
"Pilot" (Saved by the Bell: The College Years)
"Pilot" (Saving Grace)
"Pilot" (Saving Hope)
"Pilot" (Scream)
"Pilot" (Scream Queens) (2015)
"Pilot" (Scorpion)
"Original pilot" (Sealab 2021)
"Pitch Pilot" (Sealab 2021)
"Pilot" (Sean Saves the World)
"Pilot" (The Second Half)
"Pilot" (Second Time Around)
"Pilot" (The Secret Circle)
"Pilot Episode" (The Secret Diary of Adrian Mole)
"Pilot" (The Secret Diary of Desmond Pfeiffer)
"Pilot" (The Secret Lives of Men)
"Pilot" (Secret Mountain Fort Awesome)
"Pilot" (The Secret of Lost Creek)
"Pilot" (Selfie)
"Pilot" (Seven Brides for Seven Brothers)
"Pilot" (Seven Days)
"Pilot" (Seven Seconds)
"Pilot" ($#*! My Dad Says)
"Pilot" (Shades of Blue)
"Pilot" (Shameless) (American)
"Pilot" (Shark) (American)
"Pilot" (A Sharp Intake of Breath)
"Pilot" (Shasta McNasty)
"Pilot" (Shattered) (2010)
"Pilot" (Sheep in the Big City)
"Pilot" (Shell Game)
"Pilot" (Sherri) (2009)
"Pilot" (SheZow)
"Pilot" (The Shield)
"Pilot" (Shooting Stars) (British)
"Pilot" (Shooter)
"Hour One: Pilot" (Shots Fired)
"Pilot" (Siberia)
"Pilot" (Side Order of Life)
"Pilot" (Signed, Sealed, Delivered)
"Pilot" (Significant Others) (1998)
"Pilot" (Silk Stalkings)
"Pilot" (Silver Spoons)
"Pilot" (The Simple Life)
"Pilot" (The Simple Life) (1998)
"Pilot" (Sinbad)
"Pilot" (The Sinbad Show)
"Pilot" (Single Drunk Female)
"Pilot" (The Single Guy)
"Pilot" (Single Ladies)
"Pilot" (Single Parents)
"Pilot" (Singles)
"Pilot" (Sins of the City)
"Pilot" (Siren)
"Pilot" (Sirens) (2014)
"Pilot" (Sister Kate)
"Pilot" (Sit Down, Shut Up)
"Pilot" (Six Degrees)
"Pilot" (Six Feet Under)
"Pilot" (Skin) (American)
"Pilot" (Sleepwalkers)
"Pilot" (Sleepy Hollow)
"Pilot" (Sliders)
"Pilot" (Small & Frye)
"Pilot" (Smallville)
"Pilot" (Smart Guy)
"Pilot" (Smash)
"Pilot" (Smith)
"Pilot" (Sneaky Pete)
"Pilot" (Snoops) (1999)
"Pilot" (Snorks)
"Pilot" (Snowfall)
"Pilot" (So Help Me Todd)
"Pilot" (Some of My Best Friends)
"Pilot" (Someone to Watch Over Me)
"Pilot" (Sons and Daughters) (1974)
"Pilot" (Sons of Anarchy)
"Pilot" (Sons of Thunder)
"Pilot" (Sons of Tucson)
"Pilot" (The Sopranos)
"Pilot" (South Central)
"Pilot: Meet the Belles" (Southern Belles: Louisville)
"Pilot" (Space: Above and Beyond)
"Pilot" (Space Cases)
"Andy's Pilot" (Space Ghost Coast to Coast)
"Pilot" (Space Ghost Coast to Coast)
"Pilots" (Space Ghost Coast to Coast)
"Untitled Pilot 1" (Space Ghost Coast to Coast)
"Untitled Pilot 2" (Space Ghost Coast to Coast)
"Pilot" (Spaceballs: The Animated Series)
"Pilot" (Sparks)
"Unaired Pilot" (Special Unit 2)
"P-i-Pilot" (Speechless)
"Pilot" (Splitting Up Together)
"Pilot" (Sports Night)
"Pilot" (Square Pegs)
"Unaired pilot" (Squirrel Boy)
"Pilot" (The Squirrels)
"Pilot" (St. Elsewhere)
"Pilot" (Stacked)
"Pilot" (Stalker)
"Pilot" (Standoff)
"Pilot" (Star)
"Pilot" (Star of the Family)
"Pilot" (Star Spell)
"Pilots" (Star Trek: The Original Series)
"Pilot" (Star-Crossed)
"Pilot" (Stargirl)
"Pilot" (Stark Raving Mad)
"Pilot" (Starsky & Hutch)
"Pilot" (Starved)
"Pilot" (State of Affairs)
"Pilot" (State of Georgia)
"Backdoor pilot" (Station 19)
"Pilot" (Station Zero) (1999)
"Pilot" (The Street) (2000)
"Pilot" (The Streets of San Francisco)
"Pilot" (Stella) (American)
"Pilot" (Step by Step)
"Pilot" (Step Up: High Water)
"Pilot" (Steptoe and Son)
"Pilot" (Steven Universe)
"Pilot" (Still Standing) (American)
"Pilot" (Stingray) (1985)
"Pilot" (The Strip) (American)
"Pilot" (Stir Crazy)
"Pilot" (The Stones)
"Pilot" (Strange)
"Pilot" (Strange World)
"Pilot" (Strawberry Lane)
"Pilot" (Strawberry Shortcake's Berry Bitty Adventures)
"Pilot" (Strong Medicine)
"Pilot" (Studio 60 on the Sunset Strip)
"Pilot: Style & Substance" (Style & Substance)
"Pilot" (Stylista)
"Pilot" (Suburgatory)
"Pilot (Part 1)" (Sue Thomas: F.B.Eye)
"Pilot (Part 2)" (Sue Thomas: F.B.Eye)
"Pilot" (Suits)
"Pilot: Last, Best and Final" (Sullivan & Son)
"Pilot" (Summer Breeze)
"Pilot" (Summer Camp Island)
"Pilot" (Summerland)
"Pilot" (Sunny Day)
"Pilot" (Sunnyside) (American)
"Pilot" (Super Fun Night)
"Pilot" (Supergirl)
"And Lo... A Pilot Shall Come!" (The Super Hero Squad Show)
"Pilot" (Superior Donuts)
"Pilot" (Superjail!)
"Pilot" (Superman & Lois)
"Pilot" (Supernatural)
"Pilot" (Superstore)
"Pilot" (Super Why!) (1999) (Made by Cuppa Coffee and Nick Jr.)
"Pilot" (SurrealEstate)
"Pilot" (Surviving Jack)
"Pilot" (Sweet Justice)
"Pilot" (Swingtown)

T 

"Pilot" (Taken) (2017)
"Pilot" (Tarzan) (2003)
"Pilot" (Taxi Brooklyn)
"Pilot" (Teachers) (2016)
"Pilot" (The Ted Knight Show) (1978)
"Pilot" (Ted Lasso)
"Pilot" (Teech)
"Pilot" (Telenovela)
"Pilot" (Temporarily Yours)
"Pilot" (Terminator: The Sarah Connor Chronicles)
"Pilot" (Terriers)
"Pilot" (Thank God You're Here) (British)
"Pilot" (Thanks)
"That '70s Pilot" (That '70s Show)
"That '80s Pilot" (That '80s Show)
"That '90s Pilot" (That '90s Show)
"Pilot" (That's Life) (2000)
"Pilot" (Thea)
"Pilot" (Thief)
"Pilot" (Thirtysomething)
"Pilot" (This Is Us)
"Pilot" (Those Who Kill) (American)
"Pilot" (Threat Matrix)
"Pilot" (Three Sisters) (American)
"Pilot" (The Tick) (2001)
"Pilot" (The Tick) (2016)
"Pilot" (Thomas & Friends) (1983)
"...and the Pilot" (Tigtone)
"Pilot" (Tigtone)
"Pilot" ('Til Death)
"Pilot" (Till Death Us Do Part)
"Pilot" (Time After Time)
"Pilot" (Time Warp)
"Pilot" (Timeless)
"Pilot" (Titan Maximum)
"Pilot" (Titans) (2000)
"Pilot episode" (Toast of London)
"Pilot" (Tom) (American)
"Pilots" (Tom Goes to the Mayor)
"Pilot" (The Tomorrow People) (American)
"Pilot" (The Tony Danza Show) (1997)
"Pilot" (The Tony Randall Show)
"Pilot" (Too Close for Comfort)
"Backdoor pilot" (Top of the Heap)
"Pilot" (The Tortellis)
"Pilot" (Totally for Teens)
"Pilot episode" (Totally for Teens)
"Pilot" (Touch)
"Pilot" (Touching Evil) (American)
"Pilot" (Tour of Duty)
"Pilot" (Tracker)
"The Pilot" (The Tracy Morgan Show)
"Pilot" (Traffic Light)
"Pilot" (Transparent)
"Pilot" (Trapper John, M.D.)
"Pilot" (Trauma) (American)
"Pilot" (Traveler) (American)
"Pilot" (Trial & Error)
"Pilot" (Trinity) (American)
"God is Our Pilot" (Tripping the Rift)
"Pilots" (Tripping the Rift)
"Pilot" (The Troop)
"Pilot" (Trophy Wife)
"Not the Pilot" (The Trouble with Normal)
"Pilot" (The Trouble with Normal)
"Pilot" (Tru Calling)
"Pilot" (True Jackson, VP)
"Pilot" (Truth Be Told)
"Pilot" (Tucker) (2000)
"Pilot" (Turn: Washington's Spies)
"Pilot" (TV Nation)
"Pilot" (Twenty Good Years)
"Pilot" (The Twilight Zone) (1959)
"Pilot" (Twin Peaks)
"Pilot" (Twins)
"Pilot" (Twisted)
"Pilot" (Two Doors Down)
"The Pilot" (Two Guys and a Girl)
"Pilot" (Two Marriages)
"The Pilot 101" (Tyler Perry's Assisted Living)
"Pilot episodes" (Tyler Perry's House of Payne)
"Pilot" (Tyrant)

U 

"Pilot" (Ugly Americans)
"Pilot" (Ugly Betty)
"Pilot" (Uncle Buck) (1990)
"Pilot" (Uncle Buck) (2016)
"Pilot and precursors" (Uncle Grandpa)
"Pilot" (Undateable)
"Pilot" (Under the Dome)
"Pilot" (Undercovers)
"Pilot" (Underemployed)
"Pilot" (Unforgettable) (American)
"Pilot" (Unhappily Ever After)
"Pilot" (Unhitched)
"Pilot" (The Unicorn)
"Pilot" (United States of Al)
"Pilot" (United States of Tara)
"Pilot" (Unnatural History)
"Pilot" (Unsupervised)
"Pilot" (Us & Them)
"Pilot" (Up All Night)

V 

"Pilot" (V)
"Pilot" (VR.5)
"Pilot" (Valor)
"Pilot" (The Vampire Diaries)
"Pilot" (Vanished)
"Pilot" (Vegas) (2012)
"Pilot" (The Venture Bros.)
"Pilot" (Veronica Clare)
"Pilot" (Veronica Mars)
"Pilot" (Veronica's Closet)
"Pilot" (Victor and Valentino)
"Pilot" (Victorious)
"Pilot" (The Village) (2019)
"Pilot" (Vinyl)
"Pilot" (The Visitor)
"Pilot" (Viva Laughlin)

W 

"Pilot" (Walker)
"Pilot season" (Walker, Texas Ranger)
"Pilot" (Wanda at Large)
"Pilot" (Wanted) (2005)
"Pilot" (The War at Home)
"Pilot" (Warehouse 13)
"Pilot" (Wasteland) (American)
"Pilot" (The Watcher)
"Pilot" (Watching Ellie)
"The Pilot" (Waterman)
"Pilot" (Wayside)
"Pilot" (We Are Men)
"Pilot" (We Bare Bears)
"Pilot" (We Got It Made)
"Pilot" (We've Got Each Other)
"Pilot" (The Weber Show)
"Pilot" (Webster)
"Pilot" (Wedding Band)
"Pilot" (Wednesday 9:30 (8:30 Central))
"Weird Pilot" (Weird Loners)
"Pilot" (Welcome to Flatch)
"Pilot" (Welcome to New York)
"Pilot" (Welcome to The Captain)
"Pilot" (Welcome to the Family) (American)
"Pilot" (The West Wing)
"Pilot" (What About Brian)
"Pilot" (What About Joan?)
"The Pilot" (What I Like About You)
"Pilot" (What We Do in the Shadows)
"Pilot" (Whatever Happened to... Robot Jones?)
"Pilot" (Whiskey Cavalier)
"Pilot" (The Whispers)
"Pilot" (White Collar)
"Pilot" (White Famous)
"Pilot" (The White Shadow)
"Pilot" (Whitney)
"Pilot" (Who's the Boss?)
"Pilot" (The Whole Truth)
"Pilot" (Whoopi's Littleburg)
"Pilot" (Wicked City)
"Pilot" (Wild, Wild Women)
"Pilot" (Wild Card)
"Pilot" (Wild Oats)
"Pilot" (The Wild Thornberrys)
"Pilot" (Wildfire) (2005)
"Pilot" (Will & Grace)
"Pilot" (Will Trent)
"Pilot" (Windfall)
"Pilot" (The Winner)
"Pilot" (Winx Club)
"Pilot" (Wisdom of the Crowd)
"Pilot" (Wiseguy)
"Pilot" (Witches of East End)
"Pilot" (Without a Trace)
"Pilot" (WKRP in Cincinnati)
"Pilot" (Wodehouse Playhouse)
"Pilot" (Wolf)
"Pilot" (Women's Murder Club)
"Pilot" (Wonder Showzen)
"Pilot" (The Wonder Years)
"Pilot" (The Wonder Years) (2021)
"Pilot" (Woops!)
"Pilot" (Work It)
"Pilot" (Work with Me)
"Pilot" (Working)
"Pilot" (Working It Out)
"Pilot" (Working the Engels)
"Pilot" (Worst Week)
"Pilot" (The Wright Verdicts)

X 

"Pilot" (The X-Files)
"Pilot" (XIII: The Series)
"Pilote" (XIII: The Series)

Y 

"Pilot" (A Year at the Top)
"Pilot" (Yes, Dear)
"Pilots" (Yo Gabba Gabba!)
"Pilot" (You)
"Pilot" (You Rang, M'Lord?)
"Pilot" (You Wish)
"Pilot" (You Take the Kids)
"Pilot" (You're the One)
"Pilot" (You're the Worst)
"Pilot" (Your Family or Mine)
"Pilot" (Your Pretty Face Is Going to Hell)
"Pilot" (Young & Hungry)
"Pilot" (Young Americans)
"Pilot" (Young Sheldon)
"Pilot" (Younger)

Z 

"Pilot" (Zach Stone Is Gonna Be Famous)
"Pilot" (Zoe, Duncan, Jack and Jane)
"Pilot" (Zoe Ever After)
"Pilot" (Zoey's Extraordinary Playlist)
"Pilot" (Zoom) (1999)

See also 
"The Pilot" (Seinfeld), the two-part season finale of Seinfelds fourth season, about an in-universe pilot
"The Pilot" (Doctor Who), the first episode of the tenth Doctor Who series

Pilot